Culprits is an upcoming heist television series created by J Blakeson. This series is scheduled to premiere on Star via Disney+ in several countries around the world as Star Original.

Premise
A crew that conducted heists find themselves being killed off one by one.

Cast
 Nathan Stewart-Jarrett as Joe
 Gemma Arterton as Dianne
 Eddie Izzard
 Kirby Howell-Baptiste
 Niamh Algar
 Kamel El Basha
 Tara Abboud
 Ned Dennehy
 Kevin Vidal

Production
In April 2021, Disney+ had commissioned a series of multiple British produced television series, including Culprits, which was set to be written and directed by J Blakeson. In August, Nathan Stewart-Jarrett would be cast in the lead role.

Production on the series began in February 2021, with additions to the cast including Gemma Arterton, Eddie Izzard and Kirby Howell-Baptiste.

Filming of the series took place in both Europe and Ontario, with Canadian locations including Cambridge, Ontario which has become a hot spot in southwestern Ontario for location. 

UK filming took place in a house on Hickin street designed by Vandana Goyal from Studio 9 Architects, London 

Further filming took place in Manchester, United Kingdom on Dale Street and Paton Street and in a park off of Paradise Street in Rotherhithe, London during March 2022.

References

External links
 

2023 British television series debuts
Upcoming television series
Star (Disney+) original programming
2020s British crime television series
British thriller television series
English-language television shows